Bo Diddley's Beach Party is the eleventh album by rock musician Bo Diddley. Recorded live in concert in July 1963 at the Beach Club in Myrtle Beach, South Carolina, it is one of rock music's earliest live remote recordings. The album was a success in the UK Album Charts reaching #13 on July 3 and stayed on the charts for 6 weeks.

Track listing 
All songs credited to Ellas McDaniel (Bo Diddley), except as noted
Side One
 "Memphis" (Chuck Berry) – 2:09
 "Gunslinger" – 2:29
 "Hey! Bo Diddley" – 2:43
 "Old Smokey" – 3:05
 "Bo Diddley's Dog" – 3:38

Side Two
 "I'm All Right" – 3:45
 "Mr. Custer" – 2:56
 "Bo's Waltz" – 3:09
 "What's Buggin' You (Crackin' Up)" – 2:38
 "Road Runner" – 3:42

Personnel 
Performers
 Bo Diddley – lead vocals, lead guitar
 Jerome Green – drums, maracas, backing vocals
 Norma-Jean Wofford (The Duchess) – rhythm guitar, backing vocals

Production
 Marshall Chess, Max Cooperstein – producers
 John Brooks – engineer

References 

Bo Diddley albums
1963 live albums
Checker Records live albums
Albums produced by Marshall Chess